SLC25A25 antisense RNA 1 is a protein that in humans is encoded by the SLC25A25-AS1 gene.

References 

Human proteins